Kentucky Route 348 (KY 348) is a  state highway in the U.S. state of Kentucky. The highway connects mostly rural areas of McCracken, Graves, and Marshall counties with Symsonia and Benton.

Route description

McCracken County
KY 348 begins at an intersection with KY 1241 (Mayfield Road) south of Saint Johns, within McCracken County. This intersection is next to Woodlawn Memorial Gardens cemetery. It travels to the east and passes Dunaway Cemetery. It intersects the southern terminus of KY 1014 (Houser Road). It curves to the east-southeast and crosses over some railroad tracks of the Central Illinois Railroad (CIR). It intersects KY 994 (Old Mayfield Road / Mayfield–Paducah Road). The highway intersects the southern terminus of KY 1954 (Husband Road). After crossing Arnold Branch, it intersects the western terminus of KY 1255 (Bonds Road) and curves to the south-southwest. It curves to the south-southeast and crosses over Camp Creek before entering Hardmoney. There, it intersects the northern terminus of KY 1684 (Hardmoney Road) and curves to the east-southeast. It then enters Graves County.

Graves and Marshall counties
KY 348 curves to the southeast and intersects the southern terminus of KY 450 (Oaks Road). It crosses over the West Fork Clarks River and enters Symsonia. There, it intersects KY 131, travels north of Symsonia Elementary School, intersects the northern terminus of KY 534, passes Symsonia Cemetery, and intersects the northern terminus of KY 1949. This last intersection is on the eastern edge of Symsonia. It crosses over Lick Creek and enters Marshall County. KY 348 passes Freezor Cemetery and intersects the northern terminus of KY 1490 (Elva Road). It travels south of New Harmony Cemetery and crosses over Middle Fork Creek. The highway intersects the northern terminus of KY 2606 (Jackson School Road). It crosses over Little Bee Creek and enter Benton. It curves to the east-southeast and crosses over Bee Creek and intersects the northern terminus of KY 1558 (Ivey Road). It curves to the east-northeast and temporarily leaves the city limits of Benton. While out of the city, it has an interchange with the Purchase Parkway (future Interstate 69 (I-69)). After it re-enters Benton, it continues to the east-southeast and meets its eastern terminus, an intersection with US 641/KY 58 (Main Street / Poplar Street) on one-way pairs.

Major intersections

See also

References

0348
Transportation in McCracken County, Kentucky
Transportation in Graves County, Kentucky
Transportation in Marshall County, Kentucky